Neuropsychopharmacology is a monthly peer-reviewed scientific journal published by Springer Nature. It was established in 1987 and is an official publication of the American College of Neuropsychopharmacology. The journal covers all aspects of neuropsychopharmacology, including clinical and basic science research into the brain and behavior, the properties of agents acting within the central nervous system, and drug targeting and development.

Editors-in-chief
Over the years, there have been ten editors-in-chief ("principal editors"), including J. Christian Gillin (1987-1993), Ronald D. Ciaranello (1994), Herbert Y. Meltzer (1994-1998), Hans C. Fibiger (1995-1998), Robert H. Lenox (1999-2001), Charles B. Nemeroff (2002-2006), and James H. Meador-Woodruff (2007-2012) and William A. Carlezon, Jr. (2013-2022). Since 2023, Tony P. George (University of Toronto) and Lisa M. Monteggia (Vanderbilt University) have been co-editors.

Abstracting and indexing
The journal is abstracted and indexed in:

According to the Journal Citation Reports, the journal has a 2021 impact factor of 8.294.

References

External links

English-language journals
Monthly journals
Nature Research academic journals
Neuroscience journals
Pharmacology journals
Psychiatry journals
Publications established in 1993